Wijn or de Wijn is a surname. Notable people with the surname include: 

Jan Wijn (born 1934), Dutch pianist
Joop Wijn (born 1969), Dutch politician
Piet Wijn (1929–2010), Dutch comics creator
Sander de Wijn (born 1990), Dutch field hockey player